Pyrrocaine is a local anesthetic drug. The cogency of pyrrocaine is equivalent to lidocaine in blocking the motor nerve and sensory. Pyrrocaine was proven to be somewhat harmless compared to lidocaine. No signs of methemoglobinemia was found while observing. It was considered unsafe for acute porphyria treatment. No evidence is found that it is profitly used now.

History 
In the 1960s it was most of the time used as a nerve blocker dental anesthetic and dentists recommended it due to its fast commencement.

Adverse effects 
Pyrrocane has very similar side effects on blood pressure and heart rate compared to lidocaine.

Synthesis
Selfsame as lidocaine, albeit interposing pyrrolidine for diethylamine.

Amide formation between 2,6-Dimethylaniline (1) and Chloroacetyl chloride (2) gives [1131-01-7] (3). Displacement of the remaining halogen by pyrrolidine (4) completed the synthesis of Pyrrocaine (5).

See also 
 Procaine
 Trimecaine
 Local anesthetic
 List of local anesthetics

References 

Local anesthetics